Umm al-Qamari Islands in Saudi Arabia is a national nature reserve managed by the Saudi Wildlife Authority.

Overview 
Umm al-Qamari islands are located north to Alqunfutha, a city on the coast of the Red sea. It has an area of 4.03 km². The islands were listed as a protected area in 1977 to be the first protected area in Saudi Arabia.

Birdlife 
The reserve is home to a variety of birdlife, mostly Collared doves and Turtle doves for which the islands were named. There are other birds breed and live in the islands such as Herons, Pelicans, Gulls and Osprey.

See also 

 List of protected areas of Saudi Arabia

References 



Protected areas of Saudi Arabia